Black Cultural Archives (BCA) is an archive and heritage centre in Brixton, London, devoted to the histories of people of African and Caribbean descent in Britain. Also known as BCA, it was founded in 1981, by educationalist and historian Len Garrison and others. BCA's mission is to record, preserve and celebrate the history of people of African descent in Britain. The BCA's new building in Brixton, opened in 2014, enables access to the archive collection, provides dedicated learning spaces and mounts a programme of exhibitions and events.

History
In 1981, Len Garrison and other members of the Black British community started a collection, originally housed in Coldharbour Lane in Brixton and later based in Kennington, that sought to redress the historical imbalance of the representation of black people in Britain.

In 2010 the BCA won major funding, including £5million from the Heritage Lottery Fund (HLF) and the London Development Agency, and moved back to Brixton to become the UK's first national black heritage centre. A site dedication ceremony took place in June 2013, and the new BCA building – a Grade II-listed Georgian building, the former Raleigh Hall – at 1 Windrush Square, was officially opened on 24 July 2014. Designed by architects Pringle Richards Sharratt, it was named in 2015 as "Building of the Year" in the New London Architecture awards.

On 16 February 2017, BCA received a royal visit from Charles, Prince of Wales, and the Duchess of Cornwall, during which Prince Charles praised the contribution of people from the West Indies and Africa in World War I and World War II.

The current managing director of BCA is Arike Oke, who took up the appointment in February 2019 after Paul Reid, director since 2006, stepped down.

Collections
In 2008, a two-year HLF-funded project called "Documenting the Archive" enabled the cataloguing of BCA's collections of books, objects, and archives, which "document the hidden stories and experiences of Black people either through personal and family journeys or through the rich network of Black-led community organisations", and "celebrate Black achievements "alongside the strong sense of campaigning and resistance to racial inequalities." BCA's records are also accessible through an online catalogue.

Exhibitions and projects

BCA's inaugural exhibition was Re-imagine: Black Women in Britain (24 July–30 November 2014), which chronicled "the often hidden histories of Britain's black foremothers", including Mary Seacole, Mary Prince, Adelaide Hall, Olive Morris, Jessica Huntley, among others. In October 2016 this exhibition was launched online as part of the Google Cultural Institute.

BCA worked over a period of years with the Victoria and Albert Museum to acquire photographs either by black photographers or that document the lives of black people in Britain, complemented by a range or oral histories. The resultant exhibition in 2015 was entitled Staying Power: Photographs of Black British Experience, 1950s – 1990 (inspired by Peter Fryer's 1984 book Staying Power: The History of Black People in Britain).

The exhibition Black Georgians: The Shock of the Familiar, from 9 October 2015 to 4 June 2016, featured the everyday lives of Black people in Britain during the Georgian period (1714–1830), with a special feature by Christy Symington on Olaudah Equiano.

Other exhibitions have included Rastafari in Motion, the story of Emperor Haile Selassie I and the Rastafari movement in Britain (14 June–10 September 2016); Black Sound (7 April 2017–17 February 2018), the story of 100 years of musical creativity, co-curated in partnership with The Champion Agency and Lloyd Bradley; and Expectations (7 August–24 October 2018), described as "the first ever photography exhibition 'takeover' at the Black Cultural Archives using photographs taken by Neil Kenlock".

References

External links

 Black Cultural Archives official website.
 Black Cultural Archives at Google Cultural Institute

1981 establishments in England
Black British history
Archives in the London Borough of Lambeth
Cultural organisations based in London
Black British culture in London
Grade II listed buildings in the London Borough of Lambeth
Ethnic museums in the United Kingdom
Museums of the African diaspora